Ramesh S. Balsekar (25 May 1917 – 27 September 2009) was a disciple of the late Sri Nisargadatta Maharaj, a renowned Advaita master. From early childhood, Balsekar was drawn to Advaita, a nondual teaching, particularly the teachings of Ramana Maharshi and Wei Wu Wei. He wrote more than 20 books, was president of the Bank of India, and received guests daily in his home in Mumbai until shortly before his death.

Teachings 
Balsekar taught from the tradition of Advaita Vedanta nondualism. His teaching begins with the idea of an ultimate Source, Brahman, from which creation arises. Once creation has arisen, the world and life operate mechanistically according to both Divine and natural laws. While people believe that they are actually doing things and making choices, free will is in fact an illusion. All that happens is caused by this one source, and the actual identity of this source is pure Consciousness, which is incapable of choosing or doing. This false identity which revolves around the idea that "I am the body" or "I am the doer" keeps one from seeing that one's actual identity is free Consciousness.

Like other Vedanta teachers, Balsekar says that while creation and creator appear to be different and separate, that they are actually two sides of the same coin. He taught that life is a happening but there is no individual doer of life. Among his most notable students are Dorje Khandro, a former disciple of Chögyam Trungpa, and Roger Castillo.

However, Timothy Conway, a fellow student of Nisargadatta, has published a lengthy criticism of Balsekar's teachings and conduct, summarized as "unenlightened amoral fatalism". Conway provides a number of testimonials about Balsekar's alleged sexual and financial improprieties.

Books 
Confusion No More (2007), 
The Ultimate Understanding  (2002), 
Who Cares?! The Unique Teaching of Ramesh S. Balsekar (1999), 
Consciousness Speaks: Conversations with Ramesh S. Balsekar (1993), 
Duet of One: The Ashtavakra Gita Dialogue (1989),

See also 
 Nondualism
 Huangbo Xiyun
 Jason Brett Serle

References

External links 

Ramesh Balsekar's web site

1917 births
Advaitin philosophers
Indian Hindu spiritual teachers
2009 deaths